Bad Girl may refer to:

Bad girl art, a superheroine art form genre
Bad girl clause, a provision within a contract which proscribes certain behavior

Film
Bad Girl (1931 film), directed by Frank Borzage
Bad Girl (1963 film), a Japanese film
Bad Girl (1992 film), a British television film by Guy Hibbert in the anthology series ScreenPlay
Bad Girl (2012 film), a French film
Bad Girl (2016 film), an Australian film

Literature
The Bad Girl, a 2006 novel by Mario Vargas Llosa
"Bad Girl", an episode of the TV series Zoey 101
Bad Girl, a character from the video game No More Heroes

Music

Albums
Bad Girl (La Toya Jackson album) or the title song (see below) 1989
Bad Girl, or the title song, by Anita Mui, 1985
Bad Girl, by Cherry Vanilla, 1978

Songs
"Bad Girl" (Avril Lavigne song), 2013
"Bad Girl" (Beast song), 2011
"Bad Girl" (Confessions of a Shopaholic song), by Rihanna and Chris Brown, and by the Pussycat Dolls, 2009
"Bad Girl" (Danity Kane song), 2008
"Bad Girl" (Daya song), 2021 
"Bad Girl" (Fugative song), 2010
"Bad Girl" (La Toya Jackson song), 1989
"Bad Girl" (Madonna song), 1993
"Bad Girl" (Massari song), 2009
"Bad Girl" (Meisa Kuroki song), 2009
"Bad Girl" (The Miracles song), 1959
"Bad Girl" (The Zakary Thaks song), 1966
"Bad Girl" (Usher song), from the 2004 album Confessions
"Bad Girl (At Night)", by Dave Spoon featuring Lisa Maffia, 2007
"Bad Girl", by A Boogie wit da Hoodie from The Bigger Artist, 2017
"Bad Girl", by Black Buddafly and Fabolous from the Waist Deep film soundtrack, 2006
"Bad Girl", by Girls' Generation from Girls' Generation, 2011
"Bad Girl", by Lee Moses, 1967
"Bad Girl", by Miyuki Nakajima from Kansuigyo, 1982
"Bad Girl", by Neil Sedaka 1963
"Bad Girl", by New York Dolls from New York Dolls, 1973
"Bad Girl", by Rainbow, B-side of the single "Since You Been Gone", 1979
"Bad Girl", by Usher from Confessions, 2004
"Bad Girl", by Judd Hoos which represented South Dakota in the American Song Contest, 2022

See also
Bad Boy (disambiguation)
Bad Guy (disambiguation)
Bad Girls (disambiguation)